This is a list of association football clubs in South Korea from 2023 season.

K League

K League 1 

12 clubs : in Alphabetical order

 Daegu FC
 Daejeon Hana Citizen
 Gangwon FC 
 Gwangju FC
 Incheon United
 Jeju United
 Jeonbuk Hyundai Motors 
 Pohang Steelers
 FC Seoul
 Suwon FC
 Suwon Samsung Bluewings 
 Ulsan Hyundai

K League 2 

13 clubs : in Alphabetical order

 Ansan Greeners
 FC Anyang
 Bucheon FC 1995
 Busan IPark
 Cheonan City
 Chungbuk Cheongju
 Chungnam Asan
 Gimcheon Sangmu
 Gimpo FC
 Gyeongnam FC
 Jeonnam Dragons
 Seongnam FC
 Seoul E-Land

K3–K4 League

K3 League 

15 clubs : in Alphabetical order

 Busan TC
 Changwon City
 Chuncheon FC
 Daejeon Korail
 Gangneung City
 Gimhae FC
 Gyeongju KHNP
 Hwaseong FC
 FC Mokpo
 Paju Citizen
 Pocheon Citizen
 Siheung Citizen
 Ulsan Citizen
 Yangju Citizen
 Yangpyeong FC

K4 League 

17 clubs : in Alphabetical order

 Busan IPark B
 FC Chungju
 Daegu FC B
 Daejeon Hana Citizen B
 Dangjin Citizen
 Gangwon FC B
 Geoje Citizen
 Goyang Happiness
 Jeonbuk Hyundai Motors B
 Jeonju Citizen
 Jinju Citizen
 Pyeongchang United
 Pyeongtaek Citizen
 Sejong Vanesse
 Seoul Jungnang
 Seoul Nowon United
 Yeoju FC

See also
 List of women's football clubs in South Korea
 K League
 K League 1
 K League 2
 Korean FA Cup
 AFC Champions League
 K3 League
 K4 League

External links 
  KFA - Official Website
  K League - Official Website
  Taeguk-Soccer Korean soccer forum 
  ROKfootball.com website
  Footcoreen.com website
  Regular K-League news and player profiles

 
South Korea

Football clubs
clubs